The 2019–20 Liga IV Harghita was the 52nd season of Liga IV Harghita, the fourth tier of the Romanian football league system. The season began on 28 August 2019 and was scheduled to end in June 2020, but was suspended in March because of the COVID-19 pandemic in Romania. 

The season was ended officially on 14 July 2020 after AJF Harghita (County Football Association) concluded that the teams cannot meet the medical conditions imposed by the medical protocol. 

The teams ranked first in the two series, Sporting Odorheiu Secuiesc and Gheorgheni were declared county champions. For promotion play-off qualifies Gheorgheni because the team from Odorheiu Secuiesc does not have C.I.S. (Sports Identity Certificate) issued by the Ministry of Youth and Sports required to play in Liga III.

Team changes

To Liga IV Harghita
Relegated from Liga III
 —
Promoted from Liga V Harghita
 Forțeni
 Reménység Mărtiniș
 MÜ Frumoasa
 Ghimeș-Făget Lunca de Jos

From Liga IV Harghita
Promoted to Liga III
 —
Relegated to Liga V Harghita
 Târnava Betești
 Tartód Vârșag

Competition format
The league consisted of 24 teams divided into 2 series, West Series with 14 teams and East Series with 10 teams.
In the West Series he will play in a double round-robin tournament. The winner will qualify for the championship final, the team ranked 2nd will qualify for the championship final for 3rd place, and the last two ranked teams will be relegated to Liga V – Harghita County.
In the East Series, in the first phase,  regular season is played in a double round robin tournament. In the second phase, the Play-off is played between the places 1-3 (4 games),  Play-out 1 between places 4-7 (6 games), and Play-out 2 between places 8-10 (4 games).
The first place will play the championship final, the second place will play the championship final for 3rd place, and the last two ranked teams will be relegated to Liga V – Harghita County.

League tables

West Series

East Series

Promotion play-off

Champions of Liga IV – Harghita County face champions of Liga IV – Alba County and Liga IV – Brașov County.

Region 3 (Center)

Group B

See also

Main Leagues
 2019–20 Liga I
 2019–20 Liga II
 2019–20 Liga III
 2019–20 Liga IV

County Leagues (Liga IV series)

 2019–20 Liga IV Alba
 2019–20 Liga IV Arad
 2019–20 Liga IV Argeș
 2019–20 Liga IV Bacău
 2019–20 Liga IV Bihor
 2019–20 Liga IV Bistrița-Năsăud
 2019–20 Liga IV Botoșani
 2019–20 Liga IV Brăila
 2019–20 Liga IV Brașov
 2019–20 Liga IV Bucharest
 2019–20 Liga IV Buzău
 2019–20 Liga IV Călărași
 2019–20 Liga IV Caraș-Severin
 2019–20 Liga IV Cluj
 2019–20 Liga IV Constanța
 2019–20 Liga IV Covasna
 2019–20 Liga IV Dâmbovița
 2019–20 Liga IV Dolj 
 2019–20 Liga IV Galați
 2019–20 Liga IV Giurgiu
 2019–20 Liga IV Gorj
 2019–20 Liga IV Hunedoara
 2019–20 Liga IV Ialomița
 2019–20 Liga IV Iași
 2019–20 Liga IV Ilfov
 2019–20 Liga IV Maramureș
 2019–20 Liga IV Mehedinți
 2019–20 Liga IV Mureș
 2019–20 Liga IV Neamț
 2019–20 Liga IV Olt
 2019–20 Liga IV Prahova
 2019–20 Liga IV Sălaj
 2019–20 Liga IV Satu Mare
 2019–20 Liga IV Sibiu
 2019–20 Liga IV Suceava
 2019–20 Liga IV Teleorman
 2019–20 Liga IV Timiș
 2019–20 Liga IV Tulcea
 2019–20 Liga IV Vâlcea
 2019–20 Liga IV Vaslui
 2019–20 Liga IV Vrancea

References

External links
 Official website 

Liga IV seasons
Sport in Harghita County